Platy is a common name of freshwater fish in the genus Xiphophorus that lacks a "sword" at the bottom of their tails. Both species are livebearers, similar to other fish of the family Poeciliidae, such as the guppy and molly. Platies are native to the east coast of Central America and southern Mexico.

The two species, the southern platyfish and the variatus platy, have been interbred to the point where they are difficult to distinguish. Most platies now sold in aquariums are hybrids of both species.

Platy

The platy (Xiphophorus maculatus) grows to a maximum overall length of 7.0 cm (2.8 in). Sexual dimorphism is slight, the male's caudal fin being more pointed. The anal fin of the male fish has evolved into a gonopodium, a stick-shaped organ used for reproduction. The female southern platyfish's anal fin is fan-shaped. Wild varieties are drab in coloration, lacking the distinctive dark lateral line common to many Xiphophorus species. Platies can have from 20–50 fry (baby fish) at once, as often as once a month. They may also eat their own young.

Variatus platy

The variatus platy (Xiphophorus variatus) grows to a maximum overall length of 7.0 cm (2.8 in). In the wild they are olive in color with black marbling or spots on the side of the caudal peduncle. Large males show blackish blotches on the dorsal fin. Unlike some other members of the genus, X. variatus has no claw at the tip ray. The fourth pectoral ray shows well-developed serrae (i.e. saw-like notches). They typically have 20 to 24 lateral scales, 10 to 12 dorsal rays and two rows of jaw teeth.

Aquarium

Platys are widely used in tropical aquariums. Several different color variations have been developed, such as red, yellow, orange, blue, rainbow (combination of colors) and white.

Platys will usually live for around 3 years if your aquarium water parameters are correct. The Platys ideal water parameters are :

Water hardness – between 10–28 dGH.  

Temperature- as low as 15c Subtropical Aquarium 

Water pH – in range from 6.8 to 8.0

See also
Plati (disambiguation)
Platy (disambiguation)

References

Live-bearing fish
Ovoviviparous fish
Xiphophorus
Fish of Guatemala
Fish common names